Dommo Energia is a Brazilian publicly listed oil and gas company belonging to the EBX Group. Until 2017 it was known as OGX Petróleo e Gás Participações S.A. (OGX). Prior to a 2013 bankruptcy filing, OGX was Brazil's second largest oil company by market value after Petrobras.

History
OGX was founded in 2007.  In June 2008 it held initial public offering and the company was listed at BM&F Bovespa.

In September 2009, the company started its exploration activities.  At the same year OGX made its first oil discovery at the Waimea offshore field and on 31 January 2012 it started oil production.  It made several other oil discoveries.

In 2010, it discovered oil at the Pero and Inga fields in Block BM-C-40.

In 2013 OGX was forced to file for bankruptcy protection in the Court of Justice of Rio de Janeiro after defaulting on a $45m bond payment.

OGX was renamed Dommo Energia in 2017.

Operations
OGX is engaged in onshore and offshore exploration and production activities. It owns exploratory blocks in the Campos, Santos, Espírito Santo, Pará-Maranhão and Parnaíba basins in Brazil and the Cesar-Ranchería, Lower Magdalena Valley and Middle Magdalena Valley basins in Colombia.

Production at the Gaviao Real field is expected to start in 2012 and at the Waikiki field in 2013.

See also

Eike Batista

References

External links

Companies based in Rio de Janeiro (city)
Oil and gas companies of Brazil
Companies listed on B3 (stock exchange)
Non-renewable resource companies established in 2007
EBX Group
Brazilian companies established in 2007